Cola is a post-punk band from Montreal, Quebec, Canada. The band consists of Tim Darcy (vocals, guitar), Ben Stidworthy (bass), and Evan Cartwright (drums).

History 
The band's roots trace back to late 2019, when members of Ought, Tim Darcy and Ben Stidworthy, began writing music with Evan Cartwright of U.S. Girls. Darcy and Sidworthy were in Montreal at the time, while Cartwright was in Toronto. After informal writing and music sessions, the members began exchanging lyrics and song ideas into 2020 and 2021. In November 2021, the band Ought announced their disbandment, and announced the band, Cola the same day. With the announcement of the band was the release of their debut single, "Blank Curtain." The song was met with critical praise, with Rob Sheffield of Rolling Stone describing the song having a "gorgeously obsessive guitar groove". The band told Destroy Exist that the song, "is a quarter note kick drum pushing 240 bpm, a drone-like chord progression, and declarative vocals cutting through the haze. If you could invert the color of the Blank Curtain, you might have something like a Chicago house track that sounds like a band in a room."

On February 22, 2022, the band announced their debut studio album, Deep in View. The album was released on May 20, 2022.

Members
Tim Darcy – guitars, vocals
Ben Stidworthy – bass
Evan Cartwright – drums

Discography

Studio albums 
 Deep In View (2022)

Singles 
 "Blank Curtain" (2021)
 "So Excited" (2022)
 "Water Table" (2022)
 "Degree" (2022)
 "Fulton Park" (2022)

References

Canadian post-punk music groups
Musical groups from Montreal
Musical groups established in 2020
Rock music supergroups
2020 establishments in Quebec